The 15547 / 15548 Jaynagar–Lokmanya Tilak Terminus Antyodaya Express is an Express train belonging to Indian Railways East Central Railway zone that runs between  and  in India.

It operates as train number 15547 from Jaynagar to Lokmanya Tilak Terminus and as train number 15548 in the reverse direction, serving the states of  Bihar, Uttar Pradesh, Madhya Pradesh & Maharashtra.

Till 23 September 2018, it was run as the Jan Sadharan Express with ICF coach and later 24 September 2018 it's upgraded to LHB coach and runs as the Antyodaya Express.

Coaches
The 15547 / 48 Jaynagar–Lokmanya Tilak Terminus Antyodaya Express has 17 general unreserved & two SLR (seating with luggage rake) coaches. It does not carry a pantry car.

As is customary with most train services in India, coach composition may be amended at the discretion of Indian Railways depending on demand.

Service

Routing

Traction
As the route is going to electrification, a -based WDM-3D diesel locomotive pulls the train up to  later, an electric locomotive WAP-4 pulls the train to its destination.

References

External links
15547 Antyodaya Express at India Rail Info
15548 Antyodaya Express at India Rail Info

Transport in Mumbai
Rail transport in Maharashtra
Rail transport in Madhya Pradesh
Rail transport in Uttar Pradesh
Rail transport in Bihar
Transport in Jainagar
Antyodaya Express trains